Polar night is a phenomenon where night lasts for more than 24 hours that occurs in the northernmost and southernmost regions of Earth. This occurs only inside the polar circles. The opposite phenomenon, polar day, or midnight sun, occurs when the Sun remains above the horizon for more than 24 hours. 

"Night" is understood as the center of the Sun being below a free horizon. Since the atmosphere refracts sunlight, polar day is longer than polar night, and the area that is affected by polar night is somewhat smaller than the area of midnight sun. The polar circle is located at a latitude between these two areas, at approximately 66.5°. While it is day in the Arctic Circle, it is night in the Antarctic Circle, and vice versa.

Any planet or moon with a sufficient axial tilt that rotates with respect to its star significantly more frequently than it orbits the star (and with no tidal locking between the two) will experience the same phenomenon (a nighttime lasting more than one rotation period).

Description

The polar shortest day is not totally dark everywhere inside the polar circle, but only in places within about 5.5° of the poles, and only when the moon is well below the horizon. Regions located at the inner border of the polar circles experience polar twilight instead of polar night. In fact, polar regions typically get more twilight throughout the year than equatorial regions.

For regions inside the polar circles, the maximum lengths of the time that the Sun is completely below the horizon varies from zero to a few days beyond the Arctic Circle and Antarctic Circle to 179 days at the Poles. However, not all this time is classified as polar night since sunlight may be visible because of refraction. The time when any part of the Sun is above the horizon at the poles is 186 days. The preceding numbers are average numbers: the ellipticity of Earth's orbit makes the South Pole receive a week more of Sun-below-horizon than the North Pole (see equinox).

Types of polar night

As there are various kinds of twilight, there also exist various kinds of polar night. Each kind of polar night is defined as when it is darker than the corresponding kind of twilight. The descriptions below are based on relatively clear skies, so the sky will be darker in the presence of dense clouds.

Polar twilight

Polar twilight occurs in areas that are located at the inner border of the polar circles, where the Sun will be on or below the horizon all day on the winter solstice. There is then no true daylight at the solar culmination, only civil twilight. This means that the Sun is below the horizon, but by less than 6°. During civil twilight, there may still be enough light for most normal outdoor activities because of light scattering by the upper atmosphere and refraction. Street lamps may remain on and a person looking at a window from within a brightly lit room may see their reflection even at noon, as the level of outdoor illuminance will be below that of many illuminated indoor spaces. It occurs at latitudes between 67°24’ and 72°34’ North or South, when the Sun does not rise, only civil twilight visible.

Northern Hemisphere:

68° North: December 9 to January 2
69° North: December 1 to January 10
70° North: November 26 to January 16
71° North: November 21 to January 21
72° North: November 16 to January 25

Southern Hemisphere:

68° South: June 7 to July 3
69° South: May 30 to July 11
70° South: May 24 to July 18
71° South: May 19 to July 23
72° South: May 14 to July 27

Sufferers of seasonal affective disorder tend to seek out therapy with artificial light, as the psychological benefits of daylight require relatively high levels of ambient light (up to 10,000 lux) which are not present in any stage of twilight; thus, the midday twilights experienced anywhere inside the polar circles are still "polar night" for this purpose.

Civil polar night

The civil polar night period produces only a faint glow of light visible at midday. It happens when there is no civil twilight and only nautical twilight occurs at the solar culmination. Civil twilight happens when the Sun is between 0 and 6° below the horizon, and civil night when it is lower than that. Therefore, the civil polar night is limited to latitudes above 72° 34', which is exactly 6° inside the polar circle. Nowhere on mainland Europe is this definition met. On the Norwegian territory of Svalbard, however, civil polar night lasts from about 11 November until 30 January. Dikson, in Russia, experiences civil polar night from December 6 to January 6. During dense cloud cover places like the coast of Finnmark (about 70°) in Norway will get a darker "day". On the Canadian territory of Pond Inlet, Nunavut, however, civil polar night lasts from about 16 December until 26 December.

Nautical polar night
During the nautical polar night period, there is no trace of daylight, except around midday. It happens when there is no nautical twilight and only astronomical twilight occurs at the solar culmination. Nautical twilight happens when the Sun is between six and twelve degrees below the horizon. There is a location at the horizon around midday with more light than others because of refraction. During nautical night, the Sun is lower than 12° below the horizon, so nautical polar night is limited to latitudes above 78° 34', which is exactly 12° within the polar circle, or 11.5° from the pole.

The Norwegian territory of Svalbard Ny-Ålesund experiences this from December 12 to 30. Its antipode experiences this from June 12 to July 1.

The Canadian territory of Eureka, Nunavut, experiences this from December 1 to January 10. Its antipode experiences this from June 1 to July 11.

The Russian territory of Franz Josef Land experiences this from November 27 to January 15. Its antipode experiences this from May 25 to July 17.

Alert, Nunavut, the northernmost settlement in Canada and the world, experiences this from November 19 to January 22. Its antipode experiences this from May 19 to July 25.

Oodaaq, a gravel bank at the northern tip of Greenland and a disputed northernmost point of land, experiences this from November 15 to January 27. Its antipode experiences this from May 13 to July 31.

Astronomical polar night
The astronomical polar night is a period of continuous night where no astronomical twilight occurs. Astronomical twilight happens when the Sun is between twelve and eighteen degrees below the horizon and astronomical night when it is lower than that. Thus, the astronomical polar night is limited to latitudes above 84° 34', which is exactly 18° within the polar circle, or five and a half degrees from the pole. The only permanent settlement on Earth above this latitude is Amundsen–Scott South Pole Station, the South Pole scientific research station, whose winter personnel are completely isolated from mid-February to late October. During the astronomical polar night, stars of the sixth magnitude, which are the dimmest stars visible to the naked eye, will be visible throughout the entire day. This happens when the sun is between 18° and 23° 26’ below the horizon. These conditions last about 11 weeks at the poles.

The South Pole, Antarctica experiences this from May 11 to August 1 or August 2 depending on the year.

The North Pole experiences this from November 13 to January 29.

Polar Sun cycle
If an observer located on either the North Pole or the South Pole were to define a "day" as the time from the maximal elevation of the Sun above the horizon during one period of daylight, until the maximal elevation of the Sun above the horizon of the next period of daylight, then a "polar day" as experienced by such an observer would be one Earth-year long.

See also
Midnight sun

References

Further reading

External links
 The polar night and polar darkness
 Many years' of webcam pictures from Tromsø, Norway.  These clearly show the progression into and away from winter at a latitude within the Arctic Circle.

Earth phenomena
Polar regions of the Earth
Night